Waxworks is a 1924 German silent anthology film directed by Paul Leni. The film encompasses several genres, including a fantasy adventure, a historical film, and a horror film through its various episodes. Its stories are linked by a plot thread about a writer (William Dieterle) who accepts a job from a waxworks proprietor to write a series of stories about the exhibits of Caliph of Baghdad (Emil Jannings), Ivan the Terrible (Conrad Veidt) and Jack the Ripper (Werner Krauss) in order to boost business.

The film's format may have influenced later horror anthologies such as the British Dead of Night (1945) and the Italian Black Sabbath (1963) by Mario Bava. Critic Troy Howarth mentions "Of all the later horror anthologies, it seems to have had the most direct effect on Amicus' Torture Garden (1968), which reused the waxworks motif". The film was also known as Three Wax Men. The 1924 silent film supposedly inspired a 1988 "remake" of sorts, Waxwork, but "any similarity between the two ends there."

This film would be director Paul Leni's last film made in Germany before he went on to make The Cat and the Canary (1927) in the United States. Leni died of blood poisoning on 2 September 1929 at age 44. Some references list German screenwriter/producer Leo Birinski as a co-director, co-producer and editor of the film.

Plot
A young nameless poet (Dieterle) enters a wax museum where the proprietor works in the company of his daughter Eva (Olga Belajeff). The proprietor hires the poet to write a back-story for his wax models of Harun al-Rashid (Jannings), Ivan the Terrible (Veidt), and Jack the Ripper (Krauss) in order to draw an audience to the museum. With his daughter by his side, the poet notices that the arm of Harun al-Rashid is missing and writes a story incorporating the missing arm.

Harun al-Rashid
The poet sees himself in his story as a pie baker, Assad, where he lives with his wife Maimune (played by Olga Belajeff) directly by the walls of the palace where Harun Al-Rashid lives. Smoke from Assad's bakery covers the front of the palace, where Al-Rashid loses a game of chess, leading him to want the head of the baker. He sends his Grand Vizier to find the man, Assad, but in doing so, he finds Assad's wife with whom he is enchanted. After being captivated by her beauty and also captivating her with his status among the royals, he returns to tell Al-Rashid that he does not have the baker's head but rather something better – news about the baker's wife. Al-Rashid then resolves to go out that night, incognito, and visit the beauty.  When he steals away from his castle, the ruler witnesses an argument between the jealous Assad and Maimune, who both seem dissatisfied with their poverty-laden life. Assad then says he will rob Al-Rashid's wishing ring to solve their problems.

While Al-Rashid visits the bakery that night, Assad slips into the palace to steal the wishing ring from the finger of Al-Rashid by slicing his arm off (later it is revealed to be only a wax figurine). He is spotted by the palace guards and is chased to the rooftops where he escapes. Meanwhile, unbeknownst to him, the real Al-Rashid is in Assad's house trying to impress his wife. The returning Assad penetrates the locked house by force, while Maimune hides Al-Rashid in the baking-oven. The guards rush in to arrest Assad for the attack at the palace, but Assad's wife uses the wishing ring to wish that Al-Rashid spring forth unharmed, as he secretly comes out of the oven. She then wishes that Assad be named the official baker for Al-Rashid. Her wish is granted and the couple come under the caliph's protection. (40 minutes)

Ivan the Terrible
The second episode, treated in a slower and more somber vein, deals with the Czar of Russia, Ivan the Terrible, whom the poet describes as making 'cities into cemeteries'. The czar takes physical delight in watching his victims die, after poisoning them. Ivan's "Poison-Mixer" writes the name of the victim on an hour glass, and once they are poisoned, the glass is turned over, the man dying just as the last sand falls. The Poison-Mixer, who has taken pity on one of the victims, is singled out by Ivan as the next to be poisoned. But, unseen, the Poison-Mixer writes "ZAR IWAN" on the next hourglass. Ivan is supposed to attend the wedding of a nobleman's son; paranoid that he is being targeted, dresses the nobleman as himself, and drives the sleigh to the wedding. There, the nobleman is killed with an arrow, and his daughter (Eva) and her bridegroom (the poet) are in shock as Ivan takes over their festivities, eventually absconding with her and holding the groom in his torture chamber. On the wedding night, Ivan hears that he has been poisoned, and races to the torture chamber to reverse his fate by turning the hour-glass over; he does it again and again, and the final title says that Ivan 'became mad and turned the glass over and over til the end of his days.' (37 minutes)

Jack the Ripper
After the poet finishes the last two stories, he wakes up to find that the wax model of Jack the Ripper has come to life, but it is recognized instead to be Spring-heeled Jack. Spring-Heeled Jack stalks both the poet and the waxworks owner's daughter. The Poet and the girl flee but find that they can't escape Spring-Heeled Jack through the dark, twisted halls of the museum. As Jack draws close enough, multiple versions of him appear, and as his knife begins to slash, it provokes the poet to wake up to realize that the last experience was a dream. (6 minutes)

Cast
 Emil Jannings as Harun al-Rashid: Jannings plays the role of the pot-bellied Caliph Harun al-Rashid in the Arabian Nights tale. Jannings' take on the character of the lecherous, child-like caliph is a rare comedy role for the actor, who usually starred in more dramatic roles.
 Conrad Veidt as Ivan the Terrible: Veidt plays the role of the Russian czar Ivan the Terrible. Russian director Sergei Eisenstein would later use Veidt's model for his own rendition in Ivan the Terrible (1946). Veidt later appeared in another Leni film, The Man Who Laughs (1928).
 Werner Krauss as Jack the Ripper / Spring-Heeled Jack: Krauss plays the role of both killer figures in the film, referred to twice by different names. Krauss earlier had starred with actor Conrad Veidt in the popular horror film The Cabinet of Dr. Caligari (1920).
 William Dieterle as The Poet / Assad the Baker / A Russian noble (Boyar): Dieterle plays various roles in the film as the poet: his character writes himself into each of his own stories.
 John Gottowt as the waxworks proprietor
 Olga Belajeff as Eva / Maimune / Boyar bride
 Georg John
 Ernst Legal

Production
The film's script by Henrik Galeen was shortened by Leni, mainly by dropping the fourth tale in the anthology, about the character Rinaldo Rinaldini who was to be played by William Dieterle, a story based on the 1798 novel Rinaldo Rinaldini, the Robber Captain by Christian August Vulpius. Leni decided to substitute the short tale of Spring-Heeled Jack instead. The statue of Rinaldini is still viewable however in the scenes with the wax figures (he's the character with the large black hat).

Home media
Kino International released Waxworks on DVD in 2002. This edition has been mastered from a restoration print produced by the Cineteca del Comune di Bologna, with restoration lab work by L’Immagine Retrovata. English language intertitles from a 1924 British print have been inserted for this edition. (These give the name of the baker's wife as Zarah. The other characters played by Belajeff are not named.) The film is accompanied by a piano score composed and performed by Jon C. Mirsalis. Running time 83 minutes.

Live score
In 2013, vocalist Mike Patton and three percussionists: Matthias Bossi, Scott Amendola, and William Winant, performed a live score for the silent film, the performance of which was filmed.

See also
 List of films made in Weimar Germany

References

External links

 
 

1924 films
1920s German-language films
1924 horror films
1920s fantasy films
German horror anthology films
German fantasy films
Films of the Weimar Republic
German silent feature films
Films directed by Paul Leni
German black-and-white films
German Expressionist films
Films based on One Thousand and One Nights
Cultural depictions of Ivan the Terrible
Films about Jack the Ripper
Silent horror films
1920s German films